The 2019 season was the Tampa Bay Buccaneers' 44th in the National Football League (NFL), their 22nd playing their home games at Raymond James Stadium and their first under head coach Bruce Arians. Despite improving on their 5–11 record from 2018 with a Week 14 victory over the Indianapolis Colts, the Buccaneers missed the playoffs for the twelfth consecutive season, which meant the Buccaneers were one of two teams to not qualify for the postseason in the 2010s, with the other team being the Cleveland Browns.

This season, quarterback Jameis Winston became the first quarterback in NFL history to throw at least 30 touchdown passes and 30 interceptions in a season. This was also his final season with the Buccaneers, as he was not re-signed by the team in free agency during the 2020 offseason.

Offseason

Roster changes

Re-signings

NFL draft

Draft trades
 The Buccaneers traded their seventh-round selection in 2019 and free safety J. J. Wilcox to the Pittsburgh Steelers in exchange for Pittsburgh's sixth-round selection (202nd overall) in the 2018 NFL Draft.
 The Buccaneers traded their sixth-round selection to the Arizona Cardinals in exchange for Arizona's seventh-round selection and the rights to head coach Bruce Arians.
 The Buccaneers traded their seventh-round selection in 2020 and wide receiver DeSean Jackson to the Philadelphia Eagles in exchange for Philadelphia's sixth-round selection.

Staff

Final roster

Preseason

Regular season

Schedule

Note: Intra-division opponents are in bold text.

Game summaries

Week 1: vs. San Francisco 49ers

Bruce Arians had his regular season debut as head coach. Quarterback Jameis Winston threw three interceptions, two returned for a touchdown, as Tampa Bay lost on opening day to San Francisco.

Week 2: at Carolina Panthers

The Buccaneers led 20–14 late in the fourth quarter. In the final two minutes, Cam Newton drove the Panthers to the Tampa Bay 2-yard line. Facing a 4th-and-1 at the 2-yard line, Christian McCaffrey took a direct snap and made a fake reverse handoff, but was pushed out of bounds just short of the line to gain. Tampa Bay held on to win, their first under Bruce Arians.

Week 3: vs. New York Giants

Tampa Bay blew an 18-point lead in the second half. The New York Giants rallied behind rookie quarterback Daniel Jones, and took a 32–31 lead with 1:16 remaining in regulation. Jameis Winston connected with Mike Evans for a 44-yard reception all the way down to the Giants 9-yard line in the final seconds. Rookie kicker Matt Gay's field goal attempt sailed wide right as time expired and the Giants held on to win.

Week 4: at Los Angeles Rams

The Bucs set a franchise record for points scored with 55 in a win against the defending NFC champions. Chris Godwin had the best game of his career, catching 12 passes for 172 yards and two touchdowns, while Mike Evans hauled in a 67 yard pass for a touchdown. The Buccaneers defense picked off Jared Goff three times and forced one fumble that was returned for a touchdown by former Rams defensive tackle Ndamukong Suh to close out the game. Shaquil Barrett continued his run for Defensive Player of the Year by getting an interception, a sack and forcing the fumble that ended the game.

Week 5: at New Orleans Saints

Teddy Bridgewater threw for 314 yards and four touchdown passes, as New Orleans defeated Tampa Bay 31–24. The Saints racked up 457 yards of offense against a lackluster Buccaneers defense.

Week 6: vs. Carolina Panthers
NFL London Games

Jameis Winston threw five interceptions, had two fumbles (one lost) and was sacked seven times. The Buccaneers committed seven turnovers in a 37–26 loss to Carolina in London.

Week 8: at Tennessee Titans

Jameis Winston had 4 turnovers (two interceptions and two lost fumbles) as the Buccaneers lost 27–23 to the Titans.

Week 9: at Seattle Seahawks

Russell Wilson threw for 378 yards and five touchdown passes while the then league's best rushing defense allowed their first 100 yard rusher of the season as Chris Carson ran for 105 yards and the Seahawks produced 523 total yards against a porous Buccaneers defense en route to a 40–34 win in overtime.

Week 10: vs. Arizona Cardinals
This was the first time head coach Bruce Arians faced his former team, the Cardinals, whom he coached from 2013 to 2017. Rookie Jamel Dean made a crucial interception with less than 4 minutes remaining in the game, allowing the offense the opportunity to drive down the field and for running back Peyton Barber to score the game clinching touchdown as the Buccaneers won 30–27.

Week 11: vs. New Orleans Saints

Jameis Winston threw 4 interceptions with one returned for a touchdown while Drew Brees threw for 3 touchdowns in a dominant 34–17 rout.

Week 12: at Atlanta Falcons

Quarterback Matt Ryan was sacked 6 times, fumbled twice with one returned for a touchdown by Ndamukong Suh, and threw an interception while Jameis Winston threw 3 touchdowns and Chris Godwin caught 7 passes for a career high 184 yards and 2 touchdowns en route to a dominant 35–22 win. Defensive tackle Vita Vea became the heaviest man in NFL history to catch a touchdown pass at 347 pounds.

Week 13: at Jacksonville Jaguars

Running back Peyton Barber had 2 rushing touchdowns as the Buccaneers' defense continued their strong level of play for the second consecutive week, sacking quarterbacks Nick Foles and Gardner Minshew a combined 5 times, intercepting 2 passes, forcing 3 fumbles, and recovering 2 of them with 1 returned for a touchdown by Devin White.

Week 14: vs. Indianapolis Colts

The Buccaneers overcame 4 turnovers and a 14 point deficit to defeat the Colts 38-35 en route to their first 3-game winning streak since 2016. Jameis Winston set a career best and Buccaneers single game record for the most passing yards in a home game with 461 total yards (456 passing, 5 rushing), 5 total touchdowns (4 passing, 1 rushing), and 3 interceptions (one returned for a touchdown). Winston also broke the franchise record for passing yards in a single season that he set in 2016. Despite the win, which improved the team to 6–7, Tampa Bay was eliminated from postseason contention when the Minnesota Vikings also won that day.

Week 15: at Detroit Lions

Jameis Winston became the first player in NFL history to have consecutive games of 450 yards passing as he threw for a career best 458 yards, 4 touchdowns, and 1 interception en route to breaking the franchise record for touchdown passes in a season that he set in 2016 with his 30th and the Buccaneers won their 4th straight game. Breshad Perriman set career bests in receiving yards and touchdowns as he caught 5 passes for 113 yards and 3 touchdowns. Shaquil Barrett tied the franchise record for sacks set by Warren Sapp in 2000 with 16.5.

Week 16: vs. Houston Texans

Jameis Winston threw four interceptions, including a pick 6 on the second play of the game. The Buccaneers committed five turnovers, but managed to tie the game at 20–20 late in the third quarter. Houston kicked a field goal with 7:11 remaining, and held on to win 23–20.

Week 17: vs. Atlanta Falcons

Atlanta's Younghoe Koo kicked a 33-yard field goal as time expired in regulation, sending the game to overtime. On the first play of the overtime period, Jameis Winston threw a pick-6 interception. Deion Jones returned the ball 27 yards for the touchdown to win the game for Atlanta, in the shortest overtime game in NFL history (7 seconds). It was Winston's final game with Tampa Bay, and his first pass attempt (2015) and last pass attempt were both pick 6s.

Standings

Division

Conference

References

External links
 

 In the Current, Tampa Bay Buccaneers, Jan. 14-Aug. 21, 2019. (video) 1: From Bruce Arians' First Few Days as Head Coach | 2: Finding the Next Great Buccaneer | 3: Offseason Workouts with the Bucs | 4: Dreams Fulfilled at the NFL Draft | 5: One Big Detail | 6: Leveling Up at Bucs Training Camp | 7: Our First Challenge, Bucs v. Steelers | 8: Road of Resilience | 9: Expectations Set

Tampa Bay
Tampa Bay Buccaneers seasons
Tampa Bay Buccaneers